

J.S. Schroeder Building is a historic commercial building located at 111 North Walnut Street in the Downtown Historic District of Peabody, Kansas, United States. It was listed on the National Register of Historic Places (NRHP) on December 6, 1991.

It is a  building, with the front part two-story, built of limestone.  The rear  is a one-story cinder block addition.

See also

 National Register of Historic Places listings in Marion County, Kansas

References

Further reading

External links

J.S. Schroeder Building
 
 
Peabody Downtown Historic District (building is located in this district)
 
 
Maps
 Peabody City Map, KDOT

Commercial buildings completed in 1884
Buildings and structures in Marion County, Kansas
Commercial buildings on the National Register of Historic Places in Kansas
Historic district contributing properties in Kansas
National Register of Historic Places in Marion County, Kansas